Malaysia competed in the 1991 Southeast Asian Games held in Manila, Philippines from 24 November to 3 December 1991.

Medal summary

Medals by sport

Medallists

Basketball

Men's tournament
Preliminary round

Bronze medal match

Women's tournament
Preliminary round

Bronze medal match

Football

Men's tournament
Group B

References

1991
Nations at the 1991 Southeast Asian Games